Sherlock Holmes and the Baker Street Irregulars is a 2007 BBC television drama about Sherlock Holmes and the Baker Street Irregulars, a gang of children who would occasionally help him. It stars Jonathan Pryce as Sherlock Holmes and Bill Paterson as Dr Watson with Anna Chancellor and Aaron Johnson.

Plot
The Baker Street Irregulars investigate as several of their members go missing, while also trying to prevent Sherlock Holmes – who is undergoing a personal crisis – being convicted of murder.

Cast
 Jonathan Pryce as Sherlock Holmes
 Bill Paterson as Dr. Watson
 Anna Chancellor as Irene Adler
 Michael Maloney as Inspector Stirling
 Aaron Taylor-Johnson as Finch
 Ben Smith as Jack
 Frank Murray as Mallory
 Mia Fernandez as Sadie
 Megan Jones as Jasmine
 Alice Hewkin as Tealeaf
 Brendan Patricks as Inspector Burrows

Production
It was shot and post produced in Dublin, Ireland.

Reception
Ray Bennett of The Hollywood Reporter praised the film.

References

External links

Sherlock Holmes television series
Television series by Banijay
Sherlock Holmes pastiches
2007 television films
2007 films
British television films
Films directed by Julian Kemp
2000s English-language films